Jason Neil Beckford (born 14 February 1970) is an English professional football manager and former player who is now the head coach of Canadian League1 Ontario club Simcoe County Rovers. His elder brother Darren also played professional football.

Beckford began his playing career as a forward with Manchester City, where he played 12 times in the 1988–89 Second Division promotion winning campaign. He then had brief loan spells at Blackburn Rovers and Port Vale, before signing with Birmingham City for a £150,000 fee in the 1991–92 Third Division promotion winning season. He was loaned out to Bury, before joining Stoke City in 1994. He ended the 1994–95 season at Millwall, before announcing his retirement after spending the 1995–96 season with Northampton Town.

Beckford coached in the Academy at Bolton Wanderers, before being appointed assistant manager of Mossley in June 2002. He was appointed as manager 13 months later and went on to lead the club to promotions out of the North West Counties League in 2003–04 and the Northern Premier League Division One in 2005–06. He left the club at the end of the 2006–07 season and went on to coach at Bolton and Oldham Athletic. He emigrated to Canada in 2012 and was appointed as head coach of Simcoe County Rovers in March 2022.

Playing career

Manchester City
Beckford began his career at Manchester City in 1987–88, who were then a Second Division side under the stewardship of Mel Machin. Beckford signed as an apprentice at age 16, turned professional at age 17, and made his first-team debut against Middlesbrough. City won promotion as the division's runners-up in 1988–89, and went on to finish 14th in the First Division in 1989–90 under new boss Howard Kendall. Towards the end of the 1990–91 season, new manager Peter Reid allowed Beckford to drop down a division to play four games on loan at Don Mackay's Blackburn Rovers. After returning from Ewood Park, he found himself out of the first team picture at Maine Road. John Rudge – who had sold his brother Darren a few months earlier – brought Beckford on loan to Port Vale in September as cover for the injured Keith Houchen. He claimed a goal in a 2–1 win over Grimsby Town at Blundell Park on 12 October, before leaving Vale Park after five Second Division appearances.

Birmingham City
He moved on to Birmingham City in the 1991–92 season for a £150,000 fee, but his Blues career was blighted with a serious knee injury for 20 months which kept him out of manager Terry Cooper's first team plans. He scored the "Blues" consolation goal on his debut in a 2–1 defeat to Stoke City at the Victoria Ground on 4 January, but started just two league games as Birmingham won promotion as runners-up of the Third Division. He started three games at the start of the 1992–93 campaign, and claimed a goal at St Andrew's in a 2–0 win over Southend United on 1 September. Beckford's only appearances in the 1993–94 season came at Gigg Lane in a three-game loan spell with Mike Walsh's Bury after coming back from long term injury at Birmingham.

Later career
Beckford spent the first half of the 1994–95 season at Stoke City, but made just three starts for the "Potters". He then joined Mick McCarthy's Millwall, and played nine First Division games in the second half of the 1994–95 season. However, he left The Old Den at the end of the season, and arrived at Third Division side Northampton Town for the start of the 1995–96 campaign. He made four substitute appearances for Ian Atkins's "Cobblers", before announcing his retirement at Sixfields due to the persistent knee injury.

Management and coaching career
Beckford arrived at Mossley after coaching at Manchester City and the Bolton Wanderers' Academy side. He was appointed assistant manager in June 2002 and, following Ally Pickering's sudden departure in July 2003 he was appointed team manager. He led the "Lilywhites" to second place in the North West Counties League in 2003–04, which was enough to secure a place in the Northern Premier League. A seventh-place finish in 2004–05 saw Mossley miss out on the Division One play-offs by a three-point margin, before they won the league in 2005–06. However they could not survive in the Premier Division, and Beckford left the club after relegation in 2006–07.

After leaving this post in April 2007, he returned to Bolton in 2008 as part of the club's restructured youth academy, and also worked as the under-16 coach alongside Steve Morgan at Oldham Athletic. In August 2012, he moved to Canada to work as Newmarket Soccer Club's technical director. He later coached the youth teams at Kleinberg Nobleton SC and Vaughan SC, serving as assistant coach of Vaughan's first-team in League1 Ontario in 2018. In March 2022, he was appointed as head coach of League1 Ontario club Simcoe County Rovers.

Personal life
His parents, Dudley and Valdene, were from Jamaica. His brother, Darren Beckford, is a former professional footballer, and his son Ethan Beckford has also played professional football.

Career statistics

As a player
Source:

A.  The "Other" column constitutes appearances and goals in the Anglo-Italian Cup and Football League Trophy.

As a manager

Honours

As a Player
Manchester City
Football League Second Division second-place promotion: 1988–89

Birmingham City
Football League Third Division second-place promotion: 1991–92

As a Manager
Mossley
North West Counties Football League second-place promotion: 2003–04
Northern Premier League Division One: 2005–06

References

1970 births
Living people
People from Moss Side
Black British sportsmen
English people of Jamaican descent
English footballers
Association football forwards
Manchester City F.C. players
Blackburn Rovers F.C. players
Port Vale F.C. players
Birmingham City F.C. players
Bury F.C. players
Stoke City F.C. players
Millwall F.C. players
Northampton Town F.C. players
English Football League players
English football managers
Mossley A.F.C. managers
Northern Premier League managers
English expatriate football managers
Expatriate soccer managers in Canada
English expatriate sportspeople in Canada
Association football coaches
Manchester City F.C. non-playing staff
Bolton Wanderers F.C. non-playing staff
Oldham Athletic A.F.C. non-playing staff